Tokomaru Bay is a small beachside community located on the isolated East Coast of New Zealand's North Island. It is 91 km north of Gisborne, on State Highway 35, and close to Mount Hikurangi. The district was originally known as Toka-a-Namu, which refers to the abundance of sandflies. Over the years the name was altered to Tokomaru Bay.

The two hapu or sub-tribes that reside in Tokomaru Bay are Te Whanau a Ruataupare and Te Whānau a Te Aotawarirangi. The ancestral mountain of Tokomaru Bay is Marotiri. The ancestral river is Mangahauini.

History and culture

The seven-kilometre wide bay is small but sheltered, and was a calling place for passenger ships until the early 20th century. Captain Cook spent time here on his 1769 journey of discovery, and later European settlement included a whaling station. A visit by missionaries William Williams, William Colenso, Richard Matthews and James Stack heralded the coming of Christianity to the district in 1838 and their crusade proved very successful with the local people.

The area around the bay has long been a Māori stronghold. The nearby pā at Te Mawhai was refortified by Henare Potae in the 1860s
during the battles between the Ngāti Porou and the warriors that followed the Pai Mārire movement (commonly known as Hauhau).

The town's modern economy is mainly based on agriculture and forestry, with some tourism.

Tokomaru Bay's population is predominantly Māori, with the area being a stronghold for the Ngāti Porou iwi.

Southern right whales sometimes come into bay to calve or rest.

Demographics
It is part of the wider Tokomaru statistical area.

Tokomaru Bay had a population of 444 at the 2018 New Zealand census, an increase of 12 people (2.8%) since the 2013 census, and a decrease of 54 people (−10.8%) since the 2006 census. There were 162 households, comprising 228 males and 219 females, giving a sex ratio of 1.04 males per female, with 90 people (20.3%) aged under 15 years, 66 (14.9%) aged 15 to 29, 192 (43.2%) aged 30 to 64, and 90 (20.3%) aged 65 or older.

Ethnicities were 32.4% European/Pākehā, 84.5% Māori, 5.4% Pacific peoples, 0.7% Asian, and 1.4% other ethnicities. People may identify with more than one ethnicity.

Although some people chose not to answer the census's question about religious affiliation, 34.5% had no religion, 40.5% were Christian, 14.2% had Māori religious beliefs, 0.7% were Hindu, 0.7% were Buddhist and 1.4% had other religions.

Of those at least 15 years old, 51 (14.4%) people had a bachelor's or higher degree, and 75 (21.2%) people had no formal qualifications. 30 people (8.5%) earned over $70,000 compared to 17.2% nationally. The employment status of those at least 15 was that 135 (38.1%) people were employed full-time, 45 (12.7%) were part-time, and 21 (5.9%) were unemployed.

Tokomaru statistical area

Tokomaru had a population of 954 at the 2018 New Zealand census, an increase of 21 people (2.3%) since the 2013 census, and a decrease of 102 people (−9.7%) since the 2006 census. There were 348 households, comprising 504 males and 450 females, giving a sex ratio of 1.12 males per female. The median age was 43.6 years (compared with 37.4 years nationally), with 207 people (21.7%) aged under 15 years, 156 (16.4%) aged 15 to 29, 417 (43.7%) aged 30 to 64, and 174 (18.2%) aged 65 or older.

Ethnicities were 34.3% European/Pākehā, 82.1% Māori, 6.0% Pacific peoples, 1.3% Asian, and 0.6% other ethnicities. People may identify with more than one ethnicity.

The percentage of people born overseas was 2.8, compared with 27.1% nationally.

Although some people chose not to answer the census's question about religious affiliation, 34.9% had no religion, 41.8% were Christian, 11.3% had Māori religious beliefs, 0.3% were Hindu, 0.3% were Buddhist and 0.9% had other religions.

Of those at least 15 years old, 102 (13.7%) people had a bachelor's or higher degree, and 186 (24.9%) people had no formal qualifications. The median income was $22,000, compared with $31,800 nationally. 69 people (9.2%) earned over $70,000 compared to 17.2% nationally. The employment status of those at least 15 was that 297 (39.8%) people were employed full-time, 102 (13.7%) were part-time, and 51 (6.8%) were unemployed.

Marae

Te Whānau a Ruataupare ki Tokomaru, a hapū of Ngāti Porou, has three meeting places in the area: Pakirikiri Marae and Te Hono ki Rarotonga meeting house, Tuatini Marae and Huiwhenua meeting house, and Waiparapara Marae and Te Poho o Te Tikanga meeting house.

In October 2020, the Government committed $5,756,639 from the Provincial Growth Fund to upgrade Pakirikiri, Tuatini, Waiparapara, and 26 other Ngāti Porou marae. The funding was expected to create 205 jobs.

Te Ariuru Marae and Te Poho o Te Aotawarirangi meeting house, located in the northern bay, is a meeting place of another Ngāti Porouhapū hapū, Te Whānau a Te Aotawarirangi.

Parks

Hatea-A-Rangi Memorial Park is Tokomaru Bay's sports ground and local park.

Education

Te Kura Kaupapa Māori o Tokomaru is a year 1–8 Kura Kaupapa Māori school.

All these schools are co-educational. School rolls are as of

Notable people

Tokomaru Bay was the birthplace of Ngoi Pēwhairangi, famous Maori composer and performance artist, and former All Black, Buff Milner.
Hakaraia Pahewa

References

External links

Photo and description
Ngati Porou in their own language
Biography of Ngoi Pēwhairangi

Populated places in the Gisborne District
Bays of the Gisborne District